The WK League (Hangul: WK리그) is a semi-professional women's football league, run by the Korea Football Association (KFA) and the Korea Women's Football Federation (KWFF), which represents the sport's highest level in South Korea. The regular season runs from March to October, with each team playing 21 games.

Since the inception of the WK League in 2009, three clubs have won the title: Incheon Hyundai Steel Red Angels (10), Goyang Daekyo (3), and Suwon FC (1).

Competition format
The league is contested by eight teams. Each team play against each other three times. The games are played on Monday and Thursday evenings. The regular part of the season ends when each team has played a total of 21 matches, and is followed by the playoffs: the second and third-placed teams face each other in a one-leg semi-final, with the winner facing the first-placed team in a two-leg final. The winner of the final is crowned WK League champion.

The WK League is the only women's league in the country and as such there is no relegation system in place.

Clubs

Current

Former

List of winners
The following is a list of all season's championships. Those were played over two legs. There is no away goal rule.

R denotes regular season first-place finisher

See also
 Football in South Korea
 AFC Women's Club Championship
 List of women's football clubs in South Korea
 Japan and South Korea Women's League Championship

References

External links
WK League official website 
WK League at women.soccerway.com

 
1
Women's League
South Korea
Sports leagues established in 2009
2009 establishments in South Korea